The House of Shuvalov is the name of a Russian noble family, which was documented since the 16th century. The Shuvalov family rose to distinction during the reign of Empress Elizabeth and was elevated to the rank of count on 5 September 1746.

Notable family members
Ivan Ivanovich Shuvalov (1727–1797), a lover of Empress Elizabeth and Maecenas of the Russian Enlightenment, who declined a comital title offered to him by the sovereign
Count Alexander Ivanovich Shuvalov (1710–1771), the latter's first cousin, a Field Marshal and head of the secret police
Count Peter Ivanovich Shuvalov (1711–1762), the latter's brother, a Field Marshal and Minister of War, one of the most influential policy-makers during Elizabeth's reign
Count Andrey Petrovich Shuvalov (1743–1789), the latter's son, who spent most of his life abroad, conversing with Voltaire and writing libertarian verses in French; the 1911 Encyclopædia Britannica names him as the true author of Catherine II's celebrated letters to the French Encyclopedists
Count Peter Andreyevich Shuvalov (1827–1889), the latter's grandson, who wielded great influence at the court of Alexander II of Russia
Count Pavel Andreyevich Shuvalov (1830–1908), the latter's brother, who represented Russia at the Congress of Berlin and at the German court
Count Pavel Pavlovich Shuvalov (1859–1905), the latter's son, who headed the Moscow police before his assassination by revolutionaries in 1905
Count , a Russian general during the Patriotic War of 1812
Count Mikhail Andreyevich Shuvalov (1850–1903), who inherited the title of Prince Vorontsov from his maternal grandfather, but died without issue
Countess Elizabeth Andreevna Shuvalova (1845–1924), the latter's sister, who inherited the fortune of her brother and married Count Illarion Vorontsov-Dashkov

Other people with the Shuvalov name
Eduard Shuvalov (born 1965), Siberian oil developer
Igor Shuvalov (born 1967), First Deputy Prime Minister of Russia
Sergei Shuvalov (1951—2021), Russian politician
Vadim Shuvalov (born 1958), Russian politician

Residences
The Shuvalov family's residences included three palaces in Saint Petersburg and a manor nearby:
Shuvalov Mansion – the Baroque palace of Ivan Shuvalov on Italyanskaya Street, constructed in 1749–55 to a design by Savva Chevakinsky and later sold to the Ministry of Justice of the Russian Empire, best known as the place where the Imperial Academy of Arts started to operate;
Moika Palace – the Neoclassical palace of Peter Ivanovich Shuvalov, later sold to the House of Yusupov (who decorated it with shameless opulence), best known as the place where Rasputin was killed;
 Naryshkin-Shuvalov Palace – a Neoclassical palace on the Fontanka Embankment that was inherited by Pavel Petrovich Shuvalov in 1900 from the Naryshkin family, which is now the location of the Fabergé Museum;
the manor of Pargolovo near Saint Petersburg.

Through marriage, the Shuvalovs also acquired property in Courland, including Rundale Palace, which was originally built for Ernst Johann von Biron.

Gallery

External links

 .
 Genealogisches Handbuch der baltischen Ritterschaften Teil 2,3: Estland, Görlitz 1930
 Information about Shuvalov Palace - Fabergé Museum website

Surnames